Dark Eyes is a 1951 German crime film directed by Géza von Bolváry and starring Cornell Borchers, Will Quadflieg, and Angelika Hauff.

It was shot at the Spandau Studios in Berlin. The film's sets were designed by the art directors Mathias Matthies and Ellen Schmidt.

Cast

References

Bibliography

External links 
 

1951 films
1951 crime films
German crime films
West German films
1950s German-language films
Films directed by Géza von Bolváry
Films about music and musicians
German black-and-white films
Films shot at Spandau Studios
1950s German films